Yadinis Amarís Rocha (born 1 April 1984) is a Colombian judoka. She competed in the Women's 57 kg event at the 2012 Summer Olympics. Amarís won the bronze medal of the under 63 kg division of the 2006 Central American and Caribbean Games.

References

External links
 
 Yadinys Amaris Rocha at the 2018 South American Games

1984 births
Living people
Colombian female judoka
Olympic judoka of Colombia
Judoka at the 2012 Summer Olympics
Judoka at the 2016 Summer Olympics
People from Cesar Department
Central American and Caribbean Games bronze medalists for Colombia
Competitors at the 2006 Central American and Caribbean Games
South American Games gold medalists for Colombia
South American Games medalists in judo
Competitors at the 2010 South American Games
Pan American Games silver medalists for Colombia
Pan American Games medalists in judo
Judoka at the 2019 Pan American Games
Central American and Caribbean Games medalists in judo
Medalists at the 2019 Pan American Games
21st-century Colombian women